The Barristers' Ball is an annual event held at most law schools in common law countries such as the United States, Canada, Australia, and the United Kingdom.  It is generally a formal/semi-formal affair, often near the end of the academic year, conducted by the institution's Student Bar Association as a school-wide gathering.

Alternative grammar usage by school

Examples of schools with a Barrister's Ball

Albany Law School
American University, Washington College of Law (DC)
Appalachian School of Law
Atlanta's John Marshall Law School
Arizona State University College of Law
Barry University Dwayne O. Andreas School of Law
Benjamin N. Cardozo School of Law (Yeshiva University)
Brooklyn Law School
California Western School of Law
Campbell Law School
Capital University Law School
Columbia Law School
Columbus School of Law (Catholic University of America)
Creighton School of Law
Cumberland School of Law
Dickinson School of Law
DePaul University College of Law
Drake University Law School
Drexel University Kline School of Law
Duke Law School
Duquesne University School of Law
Capital University Law School
Chicago-Kent College of Law
Emory University School of Law, Atlanta
Florida State University College of Law
Fordham University School of Law
George Mason University School of Law
Georgia State University School of Law
Georgetown University Law Center
Golden Gate University School of Law (Voted Barristers Ball of the Year 2022 by unverified sources)
Hofstra Law School
The John Marshall Law School
Lincoln Law School of Sacramento
Louisiana State University (LSU) Paul M. Hebert Law Center
Loyola Law School, Los Angeles
Loyola University Chicago School of Law
Loyola University New Orleans School of Law
Mercer University School of Law
Michigan State University College of Law
Mississippi College School of Law
Mitchell | Hamline School of Law
New England Law | Boston
North Carolina Central University School of Law
Northern Kentucky University
Northwestern University School of Law
Pace University School of Law
Pepperdine University School of Law
Quinnipiac University School of Law
Roger Williams University School of Law
Rutgers School of Law - Camden
Rutgers School of Law - Newark
Santa Clara University School of Law
Southern University Law Center
South Texas College of Law Houston
Southwestern Law School
St. Johns University School of Law
St. Louis University School of Law
St. Thomas University School of Law
Suffolk University Law School
Syracuse University College of Law
Temple University Beasley School of Law
Texas A&M School of Law (formerly Texas Wesleyan)
The George Washington University School of Law
Thomas Jefferson School of Law
Thomas M Cooley Law School
Tulane University School of Law
University at Buffalo School of Law
University of California, Berkeley, School of Law
University of California, Davis School of Law
University of California Hastings College of The Law
University of California, Irvine School of Law
University of California Los Angeles School of Law
University of Cincinnati College of Law
University of Connecticut School of Law
University of Dayton School of Law
University of Denver Sturm College of Law
University of Georgia School of Law
University of Houston Law Center
University of Idaho
University of Iowa College of Law
University of La Verne
University of Maryland Carey School of Law
University of Massachusetts School of Law - Dartmouth
University of Miami School of Law (FL)
University of Mississippi School of Law
University of Missouri School of Law
University of New Hampshire School of Law
University of North Carolina School of Law
University of Notre Dame Law School
University of Oregon School of Law
University of Pennsylvania Law School
University of Pittsburgh, School of Law
University of Richmond School of Law
University of San Diego, School of Law
University of San Francisco School of Law
University of South Carolina School of Law
University of St. Thomas School of Law (MN)
University of Texas School of Law 
University of the District of Columbia, Washington, D.C.
University of the Pacific, McGeorge School of Law
University of Virginia School of Law
Washington and Lee University
University of Wisconsin
Vermont Law School
Villanova University School of Law
Washington University in St. Louis School of Law
West Virginia University College of Law 
Widener University Delaware Law School
William and Mary Law School
WMU - Thomas M. Cooley School of Law (Tampa Bay Campus)

Examples of schools using the Barristers' Ball construction
DU Law
Duquesne School of Law
Drexel University
Harvard Law School
Liberty University School of Law
New York Law School
New York University Law School
Oklahoma City University
University of Kentucky
University of North Carolina School of Law
Washburn University School of Law

Schools using the Barristers Ball construction
Georgia State University
University of Baltimore
University of Louisville
Mercer University Law School
University of Utah

Schools using the Barrister Ball construction
Florida A&M University College of Law
Ohio State University
Touro Law School

See also
Barrister

References

Legal education
Student culture